Charles G. Chiarotti is a retired United States Marine Corps lieutenant general who last served as the Deputy Commandant for Installations and Logistics of the United States Marine Corps. Previously, he was the Deputy Commander of the United States Forces Japan.

References

Living people
Place of birth missing (living people)
Recipients of the Defense Superior Service Medal
Recipients of the Legion of Merit
United States Marine Corps generals
United States Marine Corps personnel of the Iraq War
Year of birth missing (living people)